is a passenger railway station located in the city of Tsurugashima, Saitama, Japan, operated by the private railway operator Tōbu Railway.

Lines

During the daytime, the station is served by four trains per hour in each direction.

Station layout

The station consists of two side platforms serving two tracks forming a passing loop on the single-track Ogose Line. The platforms are long enough for four-car trains. The single exit and station office is located at the Sakado end of the up (Sakado-bound) platform.

Platforms

Facilities and accessibility
Toilets are located on the Sakado-bound platform (platform 2), but no universal access facilities are available. Access to the station and platforms is via steps, and no escalators or lifts are provided.

Adjacent stations

History
The station opened on 16 December 1934, initially with a single platform on the single-track line. Ippommatsu Station takes its name from an intersection of roads about 150 metres to the northwest called "Ippommatsu Crossing". This intersection was named during the Edo Period for a single (ippon) pine tree (matsu) which stood nearby. Today, the crossing is a busy 5-way traffic intersection.

Ippommatsu became a staffed station from 17 May 1965.

Platform edge sensors and TV monitors were installed in 2008 ahead of the start of driver-only operation on the Ogose Line from June 2008. A roof was also added to the previously uncovered down (Ogose-bound) platform in 2008.

From 17 March 2012, station numbering was introduced on the Tōbu Ogose Line, with Ippommatsu Station becoming "TJ-41".

Passenger statistics
In fiscal 2019, the station was used by an average of 4451 passengers daily. 

The daily passenger figures for previous years are as shown below.

Surrounding area

Lying close to the boundary between Sakado and Tsurugashima cities, Ippommatsu Station's only exit opens onto a busy road which crosses the Ogose Line. A current problem is the narrowness of the road and the level crossing across the line. In the morning and at evening, pedestrian and vehicular traffic often become congested with commuters and students from nearby schools.

Other buildings in the area include:

 Sakado City Ōya Community Center
 Sakado Municipal Elementary School
 Tsurugashima City West Community Center
 Tsurugashima Seifū Senior High School
 Tsurugashima West Junior High School
 Shinchō Elementary School
 Tsurugashima Shimoshinden Post Office
 Sakado Morito Post Office

Future developments

The city of Tsurugashima is supporting future redevelopment of the station area, with plans to build a new overhead station structure and a station forecourt on the south side providing better vehicular access.

See also
 List of railway stations in Japan
 Ippommatsu Station (Fukuoka), in Fukuoka Prefecture

References

External links

  

Tobu Ogose Line
Railway stations in Saitama Prefecture
Stations of Tobu Railway
Railway stations in Japan opened in 1934
Tsurugashima, Saitama